Elections to the Nagaland Legislative Assembly were held in February 1969 to elect members of the 40 constituencies in Nagaland, India. Nagaland Nationalist Organisation won a majority of the seats and Hokishe Sema was appointed as the Chief Minister of Nagaland.

Nagaland was converted to a state by the State of Nagaland Act, 1962 and the first elections were called for in 1964. The five-year term for that assembly came to an end in January 1969.

Result

Elected Members

See also 
 List of constituencies of the Nagaland Legislative Assembly
 1969 elections in India

References

Nagaland
1969
1969